was a Japanese kabuki performer in the lineage of a family of kabuki actors from the Keihanshin region.

Nakamura Utaemon is a stage name.

Life and career

In 1782, Utaemon I presented this name to a favored apprentice, who was formerly known as Mizuki Tōzō or Nakamura Tōzō.  Tōzō had already appeared in many kabuki plays, including the role of Kamura in the 1781 production of Hinin no Kataakiuchi.  In the conservative Kabuki world, stage names are conveyed in formal system which converts the kabuki stage name into a mark of accomplishment.

Utaemon II abandoned his name in 1790; and he performed as Nakamura Tōzō for the rest of his life.  The natural son of Nakamura Utaemon I would become Utaemon III  in the lineage of the actor formerly known as Utaemon II.

 Lineage of Utaemon stage names
 Nakamura Utaemon I (1714–1791) 
 Nakamura Utaemon II (1752-1798) 
 Nakamura Utaemon III (1778–1838) 
 Nakamura Utaemon IV (1798–1852) 
 Nakamura Utaemon V (1865–1940) 
 Nakamura Utaemon VI (1917–2001)

See also
 Shūmei

References

Bibliography
 Leiter, Samuel L. (2006).  Historical Dictionary of Japanese Traditional Theatre. Lanham, Maryland: Scarecrow Press. ;   OCLC 238637010
 __. ( 2002).  A Kabuki Reader: History and Performance. ; ;  OCLC 182632867
 Nussbaum, Louis Frédéric and Käthe Roth. (2005). Japan Encyclopedia. Cambridge: Harvard University Press. ; OCLC 48943301
 Scott, Adolphe Clarence. (1955). The Kabuki Theatre of Japan. London: Allen & Unwin.  OCLC 622644114

Kabuki actors
1752 births
1798 deaths